List of Japanese World War II experts in Russian/Soviet topics from the 1920s until the end of World War II. The experts listed here acquired their knowledge during the Russo-Japanese War, 1918-27 Siberian intervention, and diplomatic attachés to the Soviet Union.

Aritomo Yamagata
Saburo Hayashi
Michitarō Komatsubara
Motojiro Akashi
Korechika Anami
Sadao Araki
Okikatsu Arao(Koko)
Kitsuju Ayabe
Masutaro Nakai
Shōjirō Iida
Toshizō Nishio
Torashirō Kawabe
Minoru Sasaki
Kantarō Suzuki
Jun Ushiroku
Otozō Yamada
Jirō Minami
Kyoji Tominaga
Heitarō Kimura
Shigenori Kuroda
Mitsumasa Yonai

World War II, USSR
USSR
USSR
World War II, Japan
Japan